WEBC-FM (92.3 FM) was a radio station licensed to Superior, Wisconsin and which served the Duluth-Superior metropolitan area.

History 
WEBC-FM began broadcasting on March 15, 1940, as what was then "the farthest west United States FM radio station", and with the experimental callsign W9XYH. It was an early adopter of United States low band (44-50 MHz) frequency modulation broadcasting. When the FM band was moved to its present location of 88-108 MHz in 1945, WEBC-FM (then WDUL) was the first station in the nation to begin regular programming on the new band.

References

External links 

 A Technological History of WEBC Radio 1924-1995

Radio stations in Duluth, Minnesota
Radio stations in Superior, Wisconsin
Radio stations established in 1940
1940 establishments in Wisconsin
1950 disestablishments in Wisconsin
Defunct radio stations in the United States
Radio stations disestablished in 1950
EBC-FM